Harold N. (Hal) Gabow is an American computer scientist known for his research on graph algorithms and data structures. He is a professor emeritus at the University of Colorado Boulder, and the former founding editor-in-chief of ACM Transactions on Algorithms.

Education and career
Gabow graduated summa cum laude from Harvard University in 1968, with a bachelor's degree in mathematics. He completed his Ph.D. in computer science in 1973 at Stanford University; his dissertation, Implementations of algorithms for maximum matching on nonbipartite graphs, was supervised by Harold S. Stone.

After working as an instructor at the University of Pennsylvania for a year, he joined the University of Colorado Boulder faculty in 1973 as an assistant professor of computer science. He was given tenure as an associate professor in 1979, and promoted to full professor in 1986; he retired as professor emeritus in 2008.

Gabow became the founding editor-in-chief of ACM Transactions on Algorithms (TALG), which published its first issue in 2005, after the mass resignation of the editorial board of its predecessor, Elsevier's Journal of Algorithms. He stepped down as editor on his retirement in 2008.

Recognition
Gabow was named as an ACM Fellow in 2002, "for contributions to efficient algorithms to flows, connectivity and matching". He has also won several distinguished service awards from the Association for Computing Machinery.

Personal life
Gabow is married to physician and healthcare executive Patricia A. Gabow.

References

External links
Home page

Year of birth missing (living people)
Living people
American computer scientists
Harvard College alumni
Stanford University alumni
University of Pennsylvania faculty
University of Colorado Boulder faculty
Fellows of the Association for Computing Machinery